Fairmont The Palm is a five-star hotel located on the trunk of Palm Jumeirah, Dubai, United Arab Emirates. The hotel is located on world’s largest man-made island shaped in the form of a palm tree. Fairmont The Palm, has views of the Persian Gulf and provide access to the Dubai Marina and business hubs such as Dubai Media City, Dubai Internet City and Dubai Knowledge Village. The hotel has 381 rooms and suites, including two presidential suites and a Fairmont Gold Lounge.

History
Fairmont The Palm opened in December 2012 as a joint venture between IFA Hotels & Resorts (IFA HR) and Fairmont Hotels & Resorts. IFA Hotels & Resorts spent $330 million on the development and performance of the hotel.

Clive Ford from DSA Architects International was the chief architect on the project. The hotel's interior was designed by HHCP Design International, which is based in Florida.

The hotel also has 3,000 square meters of meeting and function space including a ballroom, outdoor venues and a business center. The hotel was built at a cost of 330 million USD, and was opened on December 24, 2012.

Location
Fairmont The Palm is located in the heart of the Palm Jumeirah, on the south side of the palm trunk.

Specifications
 A total of 381 rooms comprising Queen, King, King Suite Gold, VIP Suites, Presidential Suites, Fairmont Gold Lounge.
 The hotel comprises one-bedroom units averaging 1550 square feet and two-bedroom units averaging 2400 square feet.
 The hotel has 460-metres of beachfront.

Awards
Fairmont The Palm has received a variety of hospitality awards including:
 2014 Travelers' Choice Awards - Top 25 Luxury Hotels in the United Arab Emirates
 2014 Time Out Dubai Kids Awards  - Best Family Beach Club
 2014 Time Out Dubai Awards  - Best Afternoon Tea – Mashrabiya Lounge

See also
Fairmont Hotels and Resorts
Palm Jumeirah
List of hotels in Dubai

References

2012 establishments in the United Arab Emirates
Hotel buildings completed in 2012
Palm Hotel
Hotels in Dubai
Palm Jumeirah